William Carter (12 June 1862 – 29 February 1932) was a Labour Party politician in the United Kingdom.

Carter was born in Mansfield, and became a coal miner before winning election as checkweighman.  He also became active in the Nottinghamshire Miners' Association (NMA), serving as its president in 1909, and later becoming a full-time official.  He also served on the executive of the Miners' Federation of Great Britain.

Carter was a supporter of the Labour Party, and was elected to Mansfield Town Council.  During World War I, he served on the Local Appeals Tribunal.  He was elected at the 1918 general election as Member of Parliament (MP) for Mansfield in Nottinghamshire, but was defeated at the 1922 general election by the Liberal Party candidate, Albert Bennett.

Carter did not stand for Parliament again, instead returning to the NMA.  He was elected as general secretary of the union in 1926, serving until his death in 1932.

References

External links 

1862 births
1932 deaths
Labour Party (UK) MPs for English constituencies
Miners' Federation of Great Britain-sponsored MPs
UK MPs 1918–1922